is a town located in Aki District, Kōchi Prefecture, Japan.

Geography 
Yasuda is located in southeastern  Kōchi Prefecture on the island of Shikoku. The town area is generally along the valley in the middle and lower reaches of the Yasuda River, and extends back to Umaji Village. It faces Tosa Bay in the south. Forests occupy about 80% of the town.

Neighbouring municipalities 
Kōchi Prefecture
 Aki
  Tano
 Kitagawa
 Umaji

Climate
Yasuda has a Humid subtropical climate (Köppen Cfa) characterized by warm summers and cool winters with light snowfall.

Demographics
Per Japanese census data, the population of Yasuda has been decreased steadily since the 1960s.

History 
As with all of Kōchi Prefecture, the area of Yasuda was part of ancient Tosa Province. The name of Aki District appears in Nara period . During the Edo period, the area was part of the holdings of Tosa Domain ruled by the Yamauchi clan from their seat at Kōchi Castle. The village of Yasuda was established with the creation of the modern municipalities system on October 1, 1889. It was raised to town status on February 11, 1925.

Government
Yasuda has a mayor-council form of government with a directly elected mayor and a unicameral town council of five members. Yasuda, together with the other municipalities of Aki District, contributes one member to the Kōchi Prefectural Assembly. In terms of national politics, the town is part of Kōchi 1st district of the lower house of the Diet of Japan.

Economy
Yasuda's economy is centered on Polytunnel agriculture and commercial fishing, notable for Ayu, for which the town is famous. There are two local sake brewers located in Yasuda: Minami Shuzou (Tamanoi 玉の井) and Tosatsuru (土佐鶴).

Education
Yasuda has one public elementary school and one public middle school operated by the town government. The town does not have a high school.

Transportation

Railway
Tosa Kuroshio Railway - Asa Line
 -

Highway

Sister city relations
 - Montefrío, Spain, sister city since February 2018.

Local attractions
Kōnomine-ji, 24th temple on the Shikoku Pilgrimage
Kōnomine Jinja

References

External links

 Yasuda official website 
 Yasuda Jikan

Towns in Kōchi Prefecture
Populated coastal places in Japan